Nothing Personal is a 2007 Russian drama film written and directed by Larisa Sadilova. It was entered into the 29th Moscow International Film Festival. It won the FIPRESCI prize in 2007.

Plot
Private detective Vladimir Zimin receives an order for video surveillance of an apartment. Having successfully installed the bugs and micro-cameras, he begins surveillance. Soon it turns out that the owner of the apartment, Irina, works in a drugstore and suffers from an unsettled personal life. Zimin begins to doubt that anyone can be so interested in the life of this lonely woman, that for one day in her life he is offered 500 dollars. Finally it turns out that the customer confused the apartment and the right woman lives next door. She turns out to be an attractive blonde, who is often visited by a lover, a young businessman who is also an aspiring politician.

Having switched to the new target, Zimin, however, is not in a hurry to part with his former ward.

Cast
 Valeriy Barinov as Zimin
 Zoya Kaydanovskaya as Irina
 Mariya Leonova as Blonde
 Shukhrat Irgashev as Zimin's chief
 Natalya Kochetova as Zimin's wife
 Aleksandr Klyukvin as Rich lover

References

External links
 

2007 films
2007 drama films
Russian drama films
2000s Russian-language films
Films directed by Larisa Sadilova